This is a list of international football matches of the Germany national football team from 1930 until 1942. Throughout this period they played in 123 games.

Germany's best achievement during this period was a bronze medal at the 1934 FIFA World Cup, although they made little impact on other major tournaments. The escalation of World War II in the early 1940s brought an end to competitive sport, and Germany would not play internationally again until 1950, by which time the nation had been partitioned into rival West and East zones, each with their own football systems.

List of matches 
1930 – 1940

Notes

Cancelled matches 
Below is a list of all matches in the period that were cancelled. Matches that were rescheduled to another date are not included.

See also 
 Germany national football team all-time record
 Germany national football team results (1908–1929)
 West Germany national football team results (1950–1990)
 East Germany national football team results (1952–1990)
 Germany national football team results (1990–1999)
 Germany national football team results (2000–2019)
 Germany national football team results (2020–present)
 List of Germany international footballers 1908–1942

References

External links
Results archive at German Football Association (DFB)
(West) Germany - International Results at RSSSF
Results archive at National Football Teams
Results archive at World Football

Germany national football team results